Edith Marie Reuss (3 December 1911 – December 1982) was an American clothing designer of the early 20th century. She was among the first Americans to make an impact in international markets, helping to make New York City a center of fashion. She was a contemporary of Adele Simpson and Elizabeth Hawes In the early 1930s, Reuss was known for her prints' designs, which had been launched successfully.

References

1911 births
1982 deaths
People from Pennsylvania
American fashion designers
American women fashion designers
History of New York City
20th-century American women
20th-century American people